With You (simplified Chinese: 我在你左右) is a Singaporean Chinese drama which was telecasted on Singapore's free-to-air channel, MediaCorp Channel 8. It stars Adrian Pang, Chen Hanwei, Rui En, Nat Ho & Chen Shucheng as the casts of the series. It made its debut on 12 May 2010 and ended on 8 June 2010, consisting of 20 episodes. The series was MediaCorp's most highly rated drama of 2010 and focused on the effects the supernatural had on a series of people.

Story
Owner of a DIY shop, Zhou Wen An is a rough around the edges, yet easy-going man. He gets into a traffic accident with Zhang Yang, who is on his way home to celebrate his father's birthday. Wen An, who has a keen sixth sense, feels something amiss and advises Zhang Yang to stop riding the motorcycle. The latter refuses to listen and rides off. As a result of brakes damaged earlier, Zhang Yang dies when his motorcycle gets into a subsequent accident.

After passing on, Zhang Yang's soul is trapped at the accident site. Desperately trying to return home, Zhang Yang's attempts to seek help are futile as nobody can see or hear him. Just when he thinks all hopes are dashed, Wen An appears. Besides being able to see Zhang Yang, Wen An can also communicate with him. Zhang Yang begins to pester Wen An as he strongly believes that only Wen An can help him to return home. Not one to give in to threats, Wen An tries to shake Zhang Yang off, only to have Zhang Yang re-appearing next to him time and again. Seeing that Zhang Yang is a filial son, and feeling that he was indirectly responsible for Zhang Yang's death, Wen An decides to help the latter.

Wen An starts hanging out at the coffee shop own by Zhang Yang's father, Zhang Yong Sheng. His over enthusiasm has the Zhang family thinking he is out of his mind. Despite the Zhangs' reserved attitude towards him, Wen An continues to help Zhang Yang as promised.

After returning home, Zhang Yang realizes that he is neither able to converse with his family nor help them with their problems. Witnessing his family grieve over his passing makes Zhang Yang decide to help them move on.

Business at the coffee shop gets from bad to worse. Zhang Yang approaches Wen An to help Yong Sheng revamp and modernize his outdated coffee shop. In the midst of helping the family, Wen An triggers hostility with Zhang Yang's younger brother, Zhang Huan, who feels that Wen An is being too intrusive with their domestic affairs. Zhang Huan has also accumulated huge credit card debts, and wants to buy a car. To get the money, he collaborates with a contractor to earn commission from his own father. Zhang Huan's relationship with his father deteriorates when Yong Sheng reprimands him. As a result, the hostility between the two deepens.

Jie Ying, Zhang Huan's girlfriend, is a frank and lovable girl. While working on a short film on prostitutes, she meets Wen An, who mistakes her for one. When Jie Ying decides to film a short movie on the supernatural, she pesters Wen An for his help as the latter had told her about Zhang Yang's existence. Slowly, Jie Ying finds herself attracted to Wen An and finds herself drifting away from Zhang Huan, whom she feels is too eager for success. Once again, Zhang Huan fails to see where the problem lies and pins the blame on Wen An. Zhang Huan becomes more resentful towards Wen An and accuses Wen An of being the third wheel in his relationship with Jie Ying.

After the death of Zhang Yang, Yong Sheng tries his best to keep the family together. Yet no one knows the pain he has to go through, with his youngest son causing trouble and his eldest son Zhang Wei facing domestic issues.

Easy-going by nature, Zhang Wei does not expect much from life. His only wish is to help his father keep the coffee shop. Zhang Wei's wife, Mei Xiang, feels insecure about their future. When it is announced that Yong Sheng will be modernizing the coffee shop to fulfill Zhang Yang's wish, Mei Xiang begins to make plans to safeguard her own interests for fear of being left in destitute as soon as Yong Sheng passes on.

Initially forced to care for Si Qi and her daughter, Wei Wei, Wen An soon develops a newfound respect for Si Qi when he witnesses how Si Qi faces her problems courageously – from losing her husband to discovering she's pregnant with his child to learning about a tumor in her womb. She even had to deal with the posthumous knowledge of her husband's infidelity. This knowledge deals a greater blow to her than news of his death. Emotionally drained and exhausted, Si Qi decides to leave the love she has for Zhang Yang behind, and move on.

Zhang Yang notices that Si Qi has grown to depend more and more on Wen An, and has begun treating him as her confidante. Overwhelmed by jealousy, Zhang Yang has a clash with Wen An. As a result, Wen An begins to avoid Si Qi. Over time, Si Qi starts to believe in Zhang Yang's existence as she realizes how similar Wen An is to Zhang Yang. She takes the initiative to get closer to him.

Cast

Main cast

Supporting cast

Awards & Nominations
The other dramas nominated for Best Drama Series are Breakout, Unriddle, The Family Court & New Beginnings and Best Theme Songs are New Beginnings, The Best Things in Life, The Illusionist & Breakout.

Star Awards 2011

Trivia
The series was repeated on weekdays at 3.30pm on Mediacorp Channel 8.
 The series was featured as material for television broadcasting in episodes 2 of C.L.I.F.

See also
List of programmes broadcast by MediaCorp Channel 8
List of MediaCorp Channel 8 Chinese drama series (2010s)

References

Singapore Chinese dramas
2010 Singaporean television series debuts
2010 Singaporean television series endings
Channel 8 (Singapore) original programming